Clavatula tripartita is a species of sea snail, a marine gastropod mollusk in the family Clavatulidae.

Description
The size of an adult shell varies between 26 mm and 45 mm.

Distribution
This marine species occurs from Jeffrey's Bay, South Africa to Mozambique

References

 Kilburn, R.N. & Rippey, E. (1982) Sea Shells of Southern Africa. Macmillan South Africa, Johannesburg, xi + 249 pp. page(s): 116
 Kilburn, R.N. (1985). Turridae (Mollusca: Gastropoda) of southern Africa and Mozambique. Part 2. Subfamily Clavatulinae. Ann. Natal Mus. 26(2), 417–470
 Steyn, D.G. & Lussi, M. (1998) Marine Shells of South Africa. An Illustrated Collector’s Guide to Beached Shells. Ekogilde Publishers, Hartebeespoort, South Africa, ii + 264 pp. page(s): 150
 E.A. Smith, Notes on Pleurotoma (Clionella) bipartita  Smith, 1877; Proceedings of the Malacological Society of London. v. 10 (1912–1913)
 K.H. Barnard, Contributions to the knowledge of South African marine Mollusca. Part VI. Supplement; Annals of the South African Museum. Annale van die Suid-Afrikaanse Museum v. 47 pt. 1–6; 1969

External links
 

tripartita